Hoseynabad-e Sarzeh (also Romanized as Ḩoseynābād-e Sarzeh; also known as Ḩoseynābād, Ḩoseynābād Larzeh, and Husainābād) is a village in Mud Rural District, Mud District, Sarbisheh County, South Khorasan Province, Iran. At the 2006 census, its population was 66, in 20 families.

References 

Populated places in Sarbisheh County